(English: Saint-Girons Church; Béarnese Occitan: glèisa de Sent Gironç) is a Roman Catholic church located in the commune of Monein in Pyrénées-Atlantiques, Aquitaine. The edifice is in the Gothic architectural style. Its grand size made it the largest Gothic church in Béarn in the 15th century. It is most famous for its heart of oak frame which represents the Medieval architecture style.

History

Construction 
The old Romanesque church Sant-Pée (equivalent to ) became too small for the residents, so it was decided to build a larger church next to the Lay Abbey (which no longer exists).

Monein was also a very rich village as it paid more taxes than Orthez and Oloron together, and it was one of the largest communes in Béarn because it was composed of the villages of Cuqueron and Cardesse.

Finally, the residents had religious life styles because there were 9 confraternities and 16 priests in Monein at the time.

The size of the new church should be proportional to the wealth of the village; the Église Saint-Girons of Monein is over 61 m (200 ft) long, 16 m (52.5 ft) wide and 31 m (102 ft) high. It is larger than the two cathedrals of Béarn, the Lescar Cathedral in Lescar and the Oloron Cathedral in Oloron-Sainte-Marie.

Construction of the church began in 1464 and was completed in 1530. During the 70 years of construction, residents paid for the work through numerous taxes, with the local Cagots building the church.

Others 
The church was then refurnished and it still retains a large Baroque-style altarpiece and 17th century organs from Toulouse today.

The Église Saint-Girons was restored in the late 20th  and early 21st centuries. Its heart of oak frame is now a tourist attraction.

Gallery

See also 

 Saint Girons
 Monein

Notes and references

Sources

Bibliography 
 
 
 

Churches in Pyrénées-Atlantiques
Catholic Church in France
Gothic architecture in France
Monuments historiques of Nouvelle-Aquitaine